Qacha's Nek Airport  is an airport serving Qacha's Nek, the camptown (capital) of Qacha's Nek District in Lesotho.

See also
Transport in Lesotho
List of airports in Lesotho

References

External links
 Qacha's Nek Airport
 OurAirports - Lesotho
OpenStreetMap - Qacha's Nek
 Google Earth

Airports in Lesotho